The Hong Kong Ice Hockey Association (HKIHA) is the governing body of ice hockey in Hong Kong.

History 
HKIHA was admitted to the International Ice Hockey Federation on April 30, 1983. It is one of the IIHF's full members. The current chairman is Yeung Kit Kan.

HKIHA is mainly responsible for organizing the games of the Hong Kong national ice hockey team, as well as the national women's and junior teams. The association also organizes the game operations for the Hong Kong Ice Hockey League.

In September 2021, SCMP published an article which detailed multiple complaints against the association, from former coaches and players. They accused the association of lacking transparency in corporate governance, as well as conflicts of interest between the chairman and the association, causing the development of the sport to be hampered. Some of those interviewed claimed that they had been frustrated with the association from the 1990s, and that letters to the LCSD had not fixed anything.

External links
Hong Kong at IIHF.com
Hong Kong Ice Hockey Association Official Website

References 

Ice hockey in Hong Kong
Ice hockey governing bodies in Asia
International Ice Hockey Federation members
Ice
Sports organizations established in 1983